Sagat Petchyindee (สกัด เพชรยินดี; born Wirun Phonphimai (วิรุฬห์ ผลพิมาย) on November 30, 1957), also known as Sagat Phonthawee (สกัด พรทวี), is a Thai former professional boxer, Muay Thai fighter, actor and trainer who is considered one of the greatest Muay Thai fighters of all time. He was a 3 time Lumpinee Champion, 3 time Rajadammern Champion and Muay Thai and Kickboxing World Champion.

Combat career

Muay Thai
Sagat Petchyindee (สกัด เพชรยินดี) amassed a total of 317 thaiboxing fights with 266 wins, 40 losses and 11 draws, 151 of those victories coming by way of KO/TKO.

Petchyindee also fought Dieselnoi Chor Thanasukarn twice in 1984, on June 7 and October 6, but lost both fights to Dieselnoi on points.

Petchyindee  fought Pete Cunningham and Ronnie Green.

Boxing
Moreover, Sagat Petchyindee (in the name Sagat Phonthawee) has a total of 14 professional boxing fights with 12 victories (8 KO/TKO) and 2 defeats. He lost to Wilfredo Gómez in boxing. The bout with Gomez was for the WBC's world Super Bantamweight championship and it was preceded by a large tragedy which took place when the stadium it was held at suffered a collapse, killing 10 and injuring 300. One of them was a pregnant woman with her unborn child spilling out, including the power was short-circuited. According to Virat Vachirarattanawong future his manager and  promoter, one of the spectators and sponsors of the event.

Post career
Since retiring, Sagat works as a kickboxing trainer.

Sagat taught Firas Zahabi, who later co-founded the Tristar Gym, the art of Muay Thai.

Sagat was likely the inspiration for the character Sagat in the Street Fighter video game.

Titles and accomplishments

Muay Thai
Rajadamnern Stadium
 1976 Rajadamnern Stadium 118 lbs Champion
 1984 Rajadamnern Stadium 140 lbs Champion
Lumpinee Stadium
 2x Lumpinee Stadium 135 lbs Champion (1985-1986)

Kickboxing
World Kickboxing Association
 WKA World Super Lightweight Champion

Boxing
 1986 WBC Asian Boxing Council Lightweight Champion
 1986 Thailand Lightweight Champion
 1986 OPBF Lightweight Champion (2 defenses)

Professional boxing record

Muay Thai record

|-  style="background:#fbb;"
| ? || Loss ||align=left| Stéphane Nikiéma|| || Macao || Decision || || 
|-  style="background:#fbb;"
| 1990-06-16|| Loss ||align=left| Pete Cunningham|| || Sydney, Australia || Decision (unanimous)|| 11 || 2:00
|-
! style=background:white colspan=9 |
|-  style="background:#c5d2ea;"
| 1989-09-05|| Draw||align=left| Nokweed Devy || AJKF "REAL BOUT" || Tokyo, Japan || Decision || 5||3:00
|-  style="background:#cfc;"
| 1989-03-18|| Win||align=left| Ronnie Green || AJKF  || Tokyo, Japan || Decision (Unanimous)|| 5 || 3:00
|-  style="background:#c5d2ea;"
| 1988-09-10|| Draw||align=left| Pete Cunningham|| || Anaheim, California, United States ||Decision (split) || 5 ||3:00

|-  style="background:#;"
| 1988-07-21|| ||align=left| Komtae Chor.Suan-Anan|| || Chanthaburi, Thailand || ||  ||

|-  style="background:#cfc;"
| 1988-04-02|| Win ||align=left| Raktae Muangsurin || WKA Ikki Kajiwara Memorial Show '88|| Tokyo, Japan || KO (Punches)|| 3 ||

|-  style="background:#cfc;"
| 1986-11-29|| Win ||align=left| Komtae Chor.Suan-Anan|| Japan-Thailand relation Charity event "Mysterious Muay Thai Champions Clash"|| Tokyo, Japan || Decision || 5 ||3:00

|-  style="background:#fbb;"
| 1986- || Loss||align=left| Wanpadet Sitkrumay ||Rajadamnern Stadium || Bangkok, Thailand || Decision || 5 || 3:00

|-  style="background:#fbb;"
| 1986-03-25|| Loss ||align=left| Nokweed Devy|| Lumpinee Stadium || Bangkok, Thailand || Decision || 5 || 3:00

|-  style="background:#cfc;"
| 1985-10-22|| Win||align=left| Sawainoi Daopadriew || Lumpinee Stadium || Bangkok, Thailand || KO|| 1 ||
|-
! style=background:white colspan=9 |

|-  style="background:#cfc;"
| 1985-08-30|| Win||align=left| Komtae Chor Swananan || Rajadamnern Stadium || Bangkok, Thailand || TKO (Doctor Stoppage)|| 2  ||
|-
! style=background:white colspan=9 |
|-  style="background:#cfc;"
| 1985-07-18|| Win||align=left| Fanta Phetmuangtrat || Rajadamnern Stadium || Bangkok, Thailand || KO|| 4  ||

|-  style="background:#fbb;"
| 1985-03-18|| Loss ||align=left| Krongsak Na Teerawong|| Rajadamnern Stadium || Bangkok, Thailand || Decision|| 5  || 3:00
|-  style="background:#;"
| 1985-02-15|| ||align=left| Kitty Sor.Thanikul || Lumpinee Stadium || Bangkok, Thailand || ||  ||
|-  style="background:#fbb;"
| 1984-10-06 || Loss||align=left| Dieselnoi Chor Thanasukarn || || Isan, Thailand || Decision || 5 || 3:00
|-
! style=background:white colspan=9 |
|-  style="background:#cfc;"
| 1984-05-03 || Win||align=left| Samart Prasarnmit || || Bangkok, Thailand || Referee stopapge|| 2 || 
|-  style="background:#cfc;"
| 1984-07-30 || Win ||align=left| Somsong Kiatoranee|| Rajadamnern Stadium || Bangkok, Thailand || KO (Punches) || 3 ||
|-
! style=background:white colspan=9 |

|-  style="background:#fbb;"
| 1984-06-07 || Loss||align=left| Dieselnoi Chor Thanasukarn || Rajadamnern Stadium || Bangkok, Thailand || Decision || 5 || 3:00

|-  style="background:#fbb;"
| 1982-10-21|| Loss ||align=left| Fanta Phetmuangtrat || Rajadamnern Stadium || Bangkok, Thailand || Decision || 5 ||3:00
|-  style="background:#cfc;"
| 1982-09-28|| Win ||align=left| Raktae Muangsurin || Lumpinee Stadium || Bangkok, Thailand || TKO || 2 ||
|-  style="background:#fbb;"
| 1982-08-03 || Loss||align=left| Padejsuk Pitsanurachan ||  || Bangkok, Thailand || Decision ||5 ||3:00

|-  style="background:#fbb;"
| 1982-06-10 || Loss||align=left| Padejsuk Pitsanurachan || Rajadamnern Stadium || Bangkok, Thailand || Decision ||5 ||3:00

|-  style="background:#;"
| 1982-03-04|| ||align=left| Mangkon Kiatsitchang || Rajadamnern Stadium || Bangkok, Thailand || ||  ||

|-  style="background:#;"
| 1981-11-04 || ||align=left| Pornsak Sitchang || Rajadamnern Stadium || Bangkok, Thailand ||  ||  ||
|-  style="background:#fbb;"
| 1981-09-22 || Loss||align=left| Kaopong Sitichuchai || Lumpinee Stadium || Bangkok, Thailand || TKO (Punches)|| 4 || 
|-  style="text-align:center; background:#fbb;"
| 1981-08-21 || Loss||align=left| Krongsak Sakkasem || Lumpinee Stadium || Bangkok, Thailand || Decision ||5 ||3:00

|-  style="text-align:center; background:#cfc;"
| 1981-05-29 || Win||align=left| Kaopong Sitichuchai || Lumpinee Stadium || Bangkok, Thailand || KO ||3 ||

|-  style="background:#fbb;"
| 1980-11-25 || Loss ||align=left| Krongsak Na Teerawong || Lumpinee Stadium || Bangkok, Thailand || Decision || 5 || 3:00

|-  style="background:#fbb;"
| 1980-03-05 || Loss ||align=left| Seksan Sor Theppitak || Rajadamnern Stadium || Bangkok, Thailand || Decision || 5 || 3:00

|-  style="background:#fbb;"
| 1980-01-22 || Loss||align=left| Payap Premchai || Lumpinee Stadium || Bangkok, Thailand || Decision || 5 || 3:00

|-  style="background:#fbb;"
| 1979-07-27 || Loss||align=left| Siprae Kiatsompop || Lumpinee Stadium || Bangkok, Thailand || Decision|| 5||3:00

|-  style="background:#fbb;"
| 1979-04-03 || Loss||align=left| Posai Sitiboonlert || || Bangkok, Thailand || Decision || 5 || 3:00

|-  style="background:#fbb;"
| 1979-03-03 || Loss||align=left| Jitti Muangkhonkaen|| Lumpinee Stadium || Bangkok, Thailand || Decision || 5 || 3:00

|-  style="background:#fbb;"
| 1979-01-17 || Loss||align=left| Saeksan Sor.Thepittak|| Rajadamnern Stadium || Bangkok, Thailand || Decision || 5 || 3:00

|-  style="background:#cfc;"
| 1978-12-05 || Win ||align=left| Jitti Muangkhonkaen || Lumpinee Stadium || Bangkok, Thailand || Decision || 5 || 3:00
|-  style="background:#fbb;"
| 1978-11-02 || Loss||align=left| Padejsuk Pitsanurachan || || Bangkok, Thailand || Decision || 5 || 3:00
|-  style="background:#cfc;"
| 1978-10-10 || Win||align=left| Kaopong Sitichuchai || Lumpinee Stadium || Bangkok, Thailand || KO (Punches)|| 4 ||

|-  style="background:#cfc;"
| 1978-08-28 || Win||align=left| Padejsuk Pitsanurachan ||Rajadamnern Stadium|| Bangkok, Thailand || Decision || 5 || 3:00

|-  style="background:#cfc;"
| 1978-08-18 || Win||align=left| Robbie Harbin  ||Lumpinee Stadium|| Bangkok, Thailand || KO || 1 ||

|-  style="background:#cfc;"
| 1978-09-23 || Win ||align=left| Seksan Sor Theppitak || Lumpinee Stadium || Bangkok, Thailand || KO  || 1 ||

|-  style="background:#cfc;"
| 1978-08-25 || Win ||align=left| Kaew Sit Por Daeng || || Bangkok, Thailand || KO  || 4 ||

|-  style="background:#fbb;"
| 1977-07-06 || Loss ||align=left| Jocky Sitkanpai || || Bangkok, Thailand || Decision || 5 || 3:00

|-  style="background:#cfc;"
| 1977-06-02 || Win ||align=left| Amnuaydet Davy ||Rajadamnern Stadium|| Bangkok, Thailand || Decision || 5 || 3:00

|-  style="background:#cfc;"
| 1977-05-03 || Win ||align=left| Bundit Singprakarn || || Bangkok, Thailand || KO  || 3 ||

|-  style="background:#fbb;"
| 1977-03-31 || Loss ||align=left| Jocky Sitkanpai || || Bangkok, Thailand || Decision || 5 || 3:00

|-  style="background:#cfc;"
| 1977-03-11 || Win ||align=left| Wangwon Lukmatulee || || Bangkok, Thailand || KO  || 3 ||

|-  style="background:#fbb;"
| 1977-02-24 || Loss||align=left| Narongnoi Kiatbandit || || Bangkok, Thailand || Decision || 5 || 3:00

|-  style="background:#cfc;"
| 1977-01-27 || Win ||align=left| Kengkaj Kiatkriangkrai || || Bangkok, Thailand || Decision || 5 || 3:00

|-  style="background:#fbb;"
| 1976-12-29 || Loss||align=left| Nongkhai Sor.Prapatsorn ||Rajadamnern Stadium || Bangkok, Thailand || Decision || 5 || 3:00
|-  style="background:#cfc;"
| 1976-12-07 || Win||align=left| Wangwan Lukmatulee||Lumpinee Stadium || Bangkok, Thailand || Decision || 5 || 3:00
|-  style="background:#cfc;"
| 1976-11-11 || Win||align=left| Phetmongkol Ruekchai ||Rajadamnern Stadium || Bangkok, Thailand || KO || 4 ||
|-  style="background:#cfc;"
| 1976-09-27 || Win||align=left| Anmuyadet Devy ||Rajadamnern Stadium || Bangkok, Thailand || Decision || 5 || 3:00
|-  style="background:#fbb;"
| 1976-08-26 || Loss||align=left| Narongnoi Kiatbandit ||Rajadamnern Stadium || Bangkok, Thailand || Decision || 5 || 3:00
|-  style="background:#cfc;"
| 1976-07-22 || Win||align=left| Jintadet Sakniran ||Rajadamnern Stadium || Bangkok, Thailand || Decision || 5 || 3:00

|-  style="background:#fbb;"
| 1976-06-09 || Loss||align=left| Nongkhai Sor.Prapatsorn ||Rajadamnern Stadium || Bangkok, Thailand || Decision || 5 || 3:00
|-  style="background:#cfc;"
| 1976-05-06 || Win||align=left| Jintadet Sakniran ||Rajadamnern Stadium || Bangkok, Thailand || Decision || 5 || 3:00
|-  style="background:#cfc;"
| 1976-03-26 || Win||align=left| Saksakon Sakchannarong ||Rajadamnern Stadium || Bangkok, Thailand || Decision || 5 || 3:00 
|-
! style=background:white colspan=9 |
|-  style="background:#cfc;"
| 1976-03-02 || Win||align=left| Paruhat Longneun||Lumpinee Stadium || Bangkok, Thailand || Decision || 5 || 3:00
|-  style="background:#fbb;"
| 1976-02-12 || Loss||align=left| Denthoranee Leudtaksin || Rajadamnern Stadium || Bangkok, Thailand || Decision || 5 || 3:00
|-  style="background:#cfc;"
| 1976-01-21 || Win||align=left| Kaopong Sitchuchai || || Rayong, Thailand || Decision || 5 || 3:00
|-  style="background:#cfc;"
| 1975-12-14 || Win ||align=left| Adam Sor Or Nor || Rajadamnern Stadium || Bangkok, Thailand || Decision || 5 || 3:00
|-  style="background:#cfc;"
| 1975-11-12 || Win ||align=left| Adam Sor Or Nor || Rajadamnern Stadium || Bangkok, Thailand || Decision || 5 || 3:00
|-  style="background:#fbb;"
| 1975-10-06 || Loss ||align=left| Ruenpae Sitwatnang|| Rajadamnern Stadium || Bangkok, Thailand || Decision || 5 || 3:00
|-  style="background:#cfc;"
| 1975-08-14 || Win ||align=left| Thewarat Sitponathep || Rajadamnern Stadium || Bangkok, Thailand || Decision || 5 || 3:00
|-  style="background:#cfc;"
| 1975-06-01 || Win ||align=left| Singnum Phettanin||  Rajadamnern Stadium|| Bangkok, Thailand || Decision || 5 || 3:00
|-  style="background:#cfc;"
| 1975-05-21 || Win||align=left| Singsuk Sor.Rupsoy ||Rajadamnern Stadium || Bangkok, Thailand || TKO || 4 ||
|-  style="background:#fbb;"
| 1975-04-29 || Loss ||align=left| Manachai Phetputhon|| Rajadamnern Stadium || Bangkok, Thailand || Decision || 5 || 3:00
|-  style="background:#cfc;"
| 1975-04-03 || Win||align=left| Thanupit Sit.Sor.Wor || Rajadamnern Stadium || Bangkok, Thailand || Decision || 5 || 3:00
|-  style="background:#fbb;"
| 1975-03-19 || Loss||align=left| Nongrak Singkrungthong ||Rajadamnern Stadium || Bangkok, Thailand || Decision || 5|| 3:00
|-  style="background:#cfc;"
| 1975-02-12 || Win||align=left| Panachadet Wor.Chatniran || Rajadamnern Stadium|| Bangkok, Thailand || TKO || 4 ||
|-  style="background:#cfc;"
| 1975-01-29 || Win||align=left| Dawut Sor Or Nor || Lumpinee Stadium || Bangkok, Thailand || Decision || 5 || 3:00
|-  style="background:#fbb;"
| 1975-01-06 || Loss ||align=left| Thanuthong Kiatmunagthai || Rajadamnern Stadium || Bangkok, Thailand || Decision || 5 || 3:00 
|-
| colspan=9 | Legend:

References

1957 births
Featherweight kickboxers
Sagat Petchyindee
Living people
Muay Thai trainers
Sagat Petchyindee
Sagat Petchyindee
Lightweight boxers
Welterweight kickboxers